"If It Ain't Love" is a song by American singer and songwriter Jason Derulo. It was released as a single on April 1, 2016. The song was produced by Ian Kirkpatrick and The Monsters and the Strangerz. On April 3, 2016, Derulo performed the song for the first time on television at the 3rd iHeartRadio Music Awards. The artwork of the single features Derulo in a violet suit and a fedora hat covering his eyes.

Music video
The music video for "If It Ain't Love" premiered via social video network musical.ly on May 9, 2016. It was directed by Joe Labisi and Derulo.

Charts

Weekly charts

Year-end charts

Certifications

References

External links

2016 songs
2016 singles
Jason Derulo songs
Warner Records singles
Song recordings produced by the Monsters & Strangerz
Songs written by Jason Derulo
Songs written by Talay Riley
Songs written by Lindy Robbins